Hogarth Worldwide  is a WPP-owned global company that provides marketing Implementation services, including all-channel production and language services to blue-chip international companies. Hogarth has featured in the Televisual poll of top post-production houses.

History

Hogarth was established in London in 2008. In 2009 the company formed a joint venture with WPP plc (NASDAQ:WPPGY). Richard Glasson – who joined the company in 2011 as chief operating officer – is now CEO of the business.

Hogarth has undergone rapid organic expansion over recent years as a consequence of the trend for large corporations to decouple their advertising creative development from production. Hogarth also manages and provides the production technology for in-house studio facilities at advertising agencies and client marketing organisations. 

Some of the biggest clients Hogarth works for are: Heinz, Galderma, Nestle, Ford, Johnson & Johnson, Volvo.

Offices
In 2010 the company opened an office in New York. In 2011 offices were opened in Hong Kong, Singapore, and Mexico. An office in Bucharest was opened in 2012. An offshore production platform for Hogarth was established in the year 2018 in Chennai, India.

Joint ventures
Hogarth have established joint ventures with creative agencies and clients to provide production resource and efficiencies on site at a creative agencies and client studios. These include:

Grey London – the first advertising agency to form a joint venture partnership with Hogarth creating GreyWorks, a Hogarth managed in-house facility at Grey London.
 JWT – Transmission is a joint venture between Hogarth and JWT.
 RKCR Y&R – this partnership provides studio management and production technology resource.
Ogilvy & Mather – Hogarth and Ogilvy come together through RedWorks, a joint venture formed in 2012.

Art at 164 Shaftesbury avenue
In 2011 Hogarth Worldwide gave eight rising artists a chance to exhibit their work in the London HQ, in an initiative to give support to the arts. The artists included Nathan Fox, Mike Salter, Robert Bradford, Danny Sangra, Vilaz Lisbon, Diana Taylor, Paulina Michnowska, and the late Jon Steed.

A further exhibition was added in late 2011 called 'Fish Tank'. This is visible in the London HQ windows and features a selection of bronze fish by artist Michael Chaikin.

Charitable work
Hogarth has an ongoing relationship with the Thomas Coram Foundation for Children. The company also has a partnership with Ernest Bevin College, a boys comprehensive school in Tooting, South London.

References

External links
Official Website
Instagram Views

Marketing companies of the United Kingdom
Marketing companies established in 2008
Advertising agencies of the United Kingdom